Mordecai Bartley (December 16, 1783 – October 10, 1870) was a Whig politician from northeastern Ohio. He served as the 18th governor of Ohio. Bartley succeeded his son, Thomas W. Bartley as governor, one of few instances of this happening in the United States in high offices.

Biography
Bartley was born in Fayette County, Pennsylvania. After attending the local school in Virginia, he married Elizabeth Welles in 1804 and moved to Jefferson County, Ohio.

Bartley served as a captain, and then an adjutant during the War of 1812. Following his service under General William Henry Harrison in the War, Bartley moved to Richland County, Ohio, near Mansfield. 

While farming, he was elected and served one term in the Ohio State Senate from 1816 to 1818. Elected to the United States House of Representatives in 1822, Bartley served four terms before declining to be renominated in 1830.

Bartley was an Ohio Whig Party Presidential elector in 1836 for William Henry Harrison.

He ran for governor in 1844 as a Whig after David Spangler, the original nominee, declined to run. Bartley served a single term from 1844 to 1846 before retiring again. While he was Governor, Ohio raised forty companies and 7,000 men for the Mexican–American War.

References

External links

1783 births
1870 deaths
Governors of Ohio
Ohio state senators
Ohio Whigs
Politicians from Mansfield, Ohio
1836 United States presidential electors
American military personnel of the War of 1812
Democratic-Republican Party members of the United States House of Representatives from Ohio
National Republican Party members of the United States House of Representatives from Ohio
Whig Party state governors of the United States
19th-century American politicians